The Brotherhood of the Bomb is the fourth album by the Illbient band Techno Animal, released on 11 September 2001 through Matador Records. 

While earlier Techno Animal recordings had been largely instrumental, Brotherhood of the Bomb features vocals from underground rap artists.

Track listing

Personnel 
Credits adapted from The Brotherhood of the Bomb liner notes
Techno Animal
Justin Broadrick (credited as JK Flesh) – production
Kevin Martin (credited as The Bug) – photography, design, production

Additional musicians
Rubberoom – vocals (track 1)
Antipop Consortium – vocals (track 2)
Rob Sonic – vocals (track 4)
Fred Ones – scratches (track 4)
Toastie Taylor – vocals (track 8)
El-P – vocals (track 10)
Vast Aire – vocals (track 10)
dälek – vocals (track 12)

Technical personnel
Simon Heyworth – mastering
Magus Designs – photography, design

References

External links 
 

2001 albums
Matador Records albums
Techno Animal albums